Portville, New York is a village and a town in Cattaraugus County, New York.  

Portville (village), New York 
Portville (town), New York